Italodytes stammeri is a species of beetle in the family Carabidae, the only species in the genus Italodytes.

References

Scaritinae